Frank Pfenning is a German-American professor of computer science, adjunct professor in the department of philosophy, and head of the Computer Science Department at Carnegie Mellon University.

Education and career 
Pfenning grew up in Rüsselsheim in Germany. He studied mathematics and computer science at Technische Universität Darmstadt in Germany. He then moved to the US and studied at Carnegie Mellon University, where he received his M.S. and Ph.D. in the Department of Mathematics in 1987, for his dissertation entitled Proof Transformations in Higher-Order Logic.  He was a student of Peter B. Andrews.

His research includes work in the area of programming languages, logic and type theory,
logical frameworks, automated deduction, and trustworthy computing. He is one of the principal authors of the Twelf system. He also developed Carnegie Mellon's introductory imperative programming course for undergraduates and the C0 programming language used in this course.

Honors and awards 
In 2015 he was named a Fellow of the Association for Computing Machinery "for contributions to the logical foundations of automatic theorem proving and types for programming languages." In 2016 he received the LICS Test of Time Award for the paper "A Linear Logical Framework", co-authored with Iliano Cervesato.

Personal life 
Pfenning is a competitive squash player, ranked in the top five of the university's squash ladder.

Pfenning has also appeared in an experimental film alongside Sharon Needles.

References

External links
 Dr. Pfenning's Homepage

Carnegie Mellon University alumni
Programming language researchers
Living people
Year of birth missing (living people)
Carnegie Mellon University faculty
Fellows of the Association for Computing Machinery
People from Rüsselsheim
20th-century German mathematicians
German computer scientists
Technische Universität Darmstadt alumni
21st-century German mathematicians